Paul Einzig (25 August 18978 May 1973) was an economic and political writer and journalist.  He wrote 57 books, alongside many articles for newspapers and journals, and regular columns for the newspapers Financial News (which became Financial Times) and Commercial and Financial Chronicle.

Einzig was born in Braşov, Transylvania (then a part of Hungary, now Romania), into a Jewish family, and educated in Hungary, England and France.  He earned a degree as Doctor of Political and Economic Sciences at the University of Paris from 1921 to 1923.  He moved to England in 1919, becoming a citizen in 1929.  He had a wife, Ruth, a son, Richard and a daughter. He died in London in 1973.

Works 
 International Gold Movements, 1929; 2d ed. enl., 1931
 The Bank for International Settlements, 1930
 Behind the Scenes of International Finance, 1931
 The Fight for Financial Supremacy, 1931
 The World Economic Crisis, 1929–1931, 1931
 Montague Norman: A Study in Financial Statesmanship, 1932
 The Bank for International Settlements, 1932
 The Tragedy of the Pound, 1932
 The Comedy of the Pound, 1933 
 The Economic Foundations of Fascism, 1933
 The Sterling-Dollar-Franc Tangle, 1933
 Exchange Control, 1934
 France’s Crisis, 1934
 Germany’s Default, 1934
 The Economics of Rearmament, 1934; reprint 2014
 The Future of Gold, 1934
 Bankers, Statesmen and Economists, 1935
 The Exchange Clearing System, 1935
 World Finance Since 1914, 1935. (American ed.: World Finance, 1914–1935, 1935)
 Monetary Reform in Theory and Praxis, 1936
 World Finance, 1935–1937, 1937
 World Finance, 1937–1938, 1938
 World Finance, 1938–1939, 1939
 Economic Warfare, 1940
 Europe in Chains''', 1940
 World Finance, 1939–1940, 1940
 Appeasement Before, During and After the War, 1941
 Economic Warfare 1939–1940, 1941
 Can We Win the Peace?, 1942
 The Japanese New Order in Asia, 1943
 Currency after War: The British and American Plans, 1944
 Freedom from Want, 1944
 Primitive Money, in its Ethnological, Historical and Economic Aspects, 1949; 1951; 1963
 Inflation, 1952
 How Money is Managed: The Ends and Means of Monetary Policy, 1954
 The Economic Consequence of Automation, 1956
 The Control of the Purse: Progress and Decline of Parliament's Financial Control, 1959
 In the Centre of Things, 1960
 A Dynamic Theory of Forward Exchange, 1961
 The History of Foreign Exchange, 1962; 2d ed., 1970
 Monetary Politics: Ends and Means, 1964 (new version of How Money is Managed) 
 The Euro-Dollar System: Practice and Theory of International Interest Rates, 1964; reprint 1967
 Foreign Dollar Loans in Europe, 1965
 Primitive Money, in its Ethnological, Historical and Economic Aspects, 2d ed. rev. and enl., 1966
 Textbook on Foreign Exchange, 1966
 Foreign Exchange Crises: An Essay in Economic Pathology, 1968
 Leads and Lags. The Main Cause of Devaluation, 1968
 Decline and Fall? Britain's Crisis in the Sixties, 1969
 The Euro-Bond Market, 1969
 The Case Against Floating Exchanges, 1970
 Parallel Money Markets. 1. The New Markets in London, 1971
 The Case Against Joining the Common Market, 1971
 A Textbook on Monetary Policy, 1972
 Destiny of Gold, 1972
 Destiny of the Dollar, 1972
 Parallel Money Markets. 2. Overseas Markets, 1972
 Roll-over Credits. The System of Adaptable Interest Rates, 1973
 The Euro-dollar System. Practice and Theory of International Interest Rates, 1973

References

External links 
Papers of Paul Einzig held at Churchill Archives Centre

Romanian Jews
20th-century British economists
1973 deaths
1897 births
Romanian emigrants to the United Kingdom